Gorbatov (masculine) or Gorbatova (feminine) may refer to:

People
Alexander Gorbatov (1891–1973), Soviet general
Boris Gorbatov, Russian author whose work The Youth of the Fathers was the first one performed in Belgrade Drama Theater
Konstantin Gorbatov (1876–1945), Russian painter
 
Other
Gorbatov Urban Settlement, a municipal formation which the town of district significance of Gorbatov in Pavlovsky District of Nizhny Novgorod Oblast, Russia is incorporated as
Gorbatov (inhabited locality), several inhabited localities in Russia

See also
Red Gorbatov (cattle), a cattle breed first bred in the town of Gorbatov